Mike Sussman is an American writer, producer, and editor specializing in broadcast television promotions. He wrote and produced a series of five award-winning local promotional television spots for The Andy Griffith Show for WAXN-TV in Charlotte, North Carolina.

Awards
 Two Emmy Awards from the National Academy of Television Arts and Sciences
 Promax Award from Promax/BDA
 National Addy Award from the American Advertising Federation
 Telly Award

References

 The Andy Griffith Show promo - "Mayberry 101"
 The Andy Griffith Show promo - "Mayberry Mysteries: Reunion"
 The Andy Griffith Show promo - "The Mayberry Code"
 The Andy Griffith Show promo - " Mayberry Mysteries: Ernest T. Bass"
 The Andy Griffith Show promo - "Fife Club"

American male screenwriters
American television producers
Television video editors
Living people
Year of birth missing (living people)